Our Friend, Martin is a 1999 American direct-to-video animated children's educational film about Martin Luther King Jr. and the Civil Rights Movement. It was produced by DIC Entertainment, L.P. and Intellectual Properties Worldwide, and distributed by 20th Century Fox Home Entertainment under the CBS/Fox Video label. The film follows two friends in middle school who travel through time, meeting Dr. King at several points during his life. It featured an all-star voice cast and was nominated for an Emmy Award in 1999 for "Outstanding Animated Program (For Programming More Than One Hour)". It was also the final release under the CBS/Fox Video name before it was retired. It was released three days before Martin Luther King Jr.'s 70th birthday.

Plot
Miles Woodman, an African-American boy who is a fan of Hank Aaron and attends Martin Luther King Jr. Middle School, is failing at school. His teacher Mrs. Clark tells him he could repeat 6th grade if his grades do not improve. Miles and his class visit Martin's childhood house, which has now become a museum dedicated to him. He and his white best friend Randy explore Martin's bedroom but are caught by the museum's curator Mrs. Peck, who winds up an old watch.

The boys hold Martin's baseball glove and are transported back to 1941, encountering a 12-year-old Martin playing with his two white friends Sam and Skip Dale until their mother arrives and reprimands her sons for integrating with "colored". Martin explains to Miles and Randy that her hatred of black people is that she regards them as "different", but violence would only worsen things. The boys travel three years forward in 1944 and meet a 15-year-old Martin on a segregated train, who explains that blacks and whites are unable to integrate and must be kept separate at all times. They later have dinner with Martin's family. While he goes to do rounds with his father, the boys look in his room. Then they travel 12 years forward in 1956 and meet Martin in his 20s working as a minister at a church. He is holding a meeting about the Montgomery bus boycott set off after Rosa Parks was imprisoned for refusing to give up her seat on a bus; now, black people are refusing to ride buses at all. Martin is alerted that his house has been bombed; he races home where his wife and newborn daughter have escaped unharmed. His friend Turner announces they'll attack the perpetrators with weapons in retaliation, but Martin stops him, reminding the crowd of Mahatma Gandhi peacefully standing his ground to exile the British colonies from India and of Jesus teaching love for his enemies. Miles and Randy travel to the Birmingham riot of 1963, witnessing firemen and police officers spraying black protesters with firehoses and releasing German Shepherds on them on the order of Bull Connor before arresting them.

The boys are transported back to the museum and rejoin their class at school the next day. Miles and Randy tell Miss Clark about the events prior to Martin's work. The class watches a videotape of Martin's work. After school, the boys' classmates, Latina girl Maria and another white boy Kyle, decide to investigate for themselves of how Miles and Randy got the information. When the boys arrive at the museum, Mrs. Peck lets them stay but warns them that when one messes with the past, this can affect the present. Maria and Kyle follow and catch them in Martin's bedroom. The four are transported to the March on Washington for Jobs and Freedom and meet Martin in his 30s along with a young Mrs. Clark. When they return, they discover Martin was assassinated. To save him, they travel back to 1941 and bring 12-year-old Martin to the present; however, only Miles and Martin return together, and the present is now different: the museum is burnt down; Randy and Kyle are racists and no longer friends with Miles nor even know him; Miles' school bus driver, Mr. Willis, is also now racist and refuses to allow black students to ride the bus, their school is segregated and instead named after Robert E. Lee (Jefferson Davis' military advisor in the American Civil War, which ended slavery); the principal, Mr. Harris, is also racist and mistreats Mrs. Clark; Maria works as a maid who cannot speak English; and Miles' and his mother now live in poverty.

The next day, Martin surmises that because he left his own time, it created an alternate timeline where his civil rights work never happened. Realizing he must go back to his own time, Martin bids Miles farewell despite the latter's attempted warnings of his assassination. Martin gives Miles his watch before returning to his time, where he is shot dead at the motel and the timeline returns to normal. Miles reunites with Randy, Maria, and Kyle. Mrs. Peck knows about his time traveling and tells him that while they cannot change the past, they can change the future for the better. Miles receives an A on his history project, allowing him to progress to 7th grade. He and his friends then vow to continue Martin's work.

Voice cast

 Robert Ri'chard - Miles Woodman, an avid baseball fan who tries not to fail in his class.
 Lucas Black - Randy Smith, Miles' white best friend.
 Dexter King - Martin Luther King, Jr. at age 34. This was when he did his "I Have a Dream" speech on August 28, 1963, with archive sound footage being used on his speech.
 LeVar Burton - Martin Luther King, Jr. at age 27. This was when he was a Church Minister during that time and experienced his house burning down.
 Jaleel White - Martin Luther King, Jr. at age 15. This was when he was on a train, explaining the whole boycott situation to Kyle and Randy.
 Theodore Borders - Martin Luther King, Jr. at age 12. 
 Jessica Garcia - Maria Ramirez, Miles' Latina friend.
 Zachary Leigh - Kyle Langon, Miles' white bully, but later friend.
 Ed Asner - Mr. Harris, the school principal of Martin Luther King Middle School. Although not purely racist, he bears a strong disliking of Miles.
 Angela Bassett - Mrs. Woodman, Miles' mother
 Danny Glover - Train Conductor
 Whoopi Goldberg - Mrs. Peck, the owner of the museum
 Samuel L. Jackson - Turner
 James Earl Jones - Daddy King, Martin Luther King Jr's father
 Ashley Judd - Mrs. Dale
 Richard Kind - Mr. Willis, Miles' school bus driver who takes him to school. He is nicknamed "Wild Man Willis" due to his driving methods.
 Yolanda King - Christine King, Martin Luther King Jr's sister.
 Susan Sarandon - Mrs. Joyce Clark, Miles' teacher
 John Travolta - Mr. Langon, Kyle's father
 Adam Wylie - Sam Dale/Skip Dale
 Oprah Winfrey - Coretta Scott King, Martin Luther King Jr's wife
 Frank Welker - Bull Connor/Chihuahua/German Shepherds
 Nicole Palacio - Parker Marie
 Jess Harnell - Reporter #1/Demonstrator #1
 Joe Lala - Reporter #2/Demonstrator #2
 John Wesley - Man/Demonstrator #3
 Elizabeth Primm - Old Woman/Demonstrator #4
 Jodi Carlisle - Additional Voices

Soundtrack
Motown Records released a soundtrack album for the film, featuring various artists including Diana King, Sheryl Crow, The Jackson 5, Salt-N-Pepa, Montell Jordan, 702, and Stevie Wonder. The soundtrack also features a cover of "Ain't No Mountain High Enough" by Debelah Morgan, which combined the Marvin Gaye/Tammi Terrell and Diana Ross versions.

Track list:
 "Imagine"  - Salt-N-Pepa featuring Sheryl Crow
 "Feelin' It" - Antuan & Ray Ray featuring P-Nutt and Shortee Red
 "Ain't No Mountain High Enough" - Debelah Morgan
 "Finding My Way" - 702
 "When They Were Kings" - Brian McKnight and Diana King
 "I'll Be There" - The Jackson 5
 "What's Going On" - Marvin Gaye
 "4 You" - Montell Jordan featuring Schappell Crawford and Fulfillment Choir
 "Place in the World" - Shanice
 "Reach Out and Touch (Somebody's Hand)" - Diana Ross
 "Happy Birthday" - Stevie Wonder
 "As Long as I Can Dream" - Debelah Morgan

See also
 Civil rights movement in popular culture

External links

 
 

1999 animated films
1990s educational films
Films about race and ethnicity
Films about racism
American biographical films
American direct-to-video films
American children's animated adventure films
American children's animated fantasy films
DIC Entertainment films
Direct-to-video animated films
Films about Martin Luther King Jr.
Films set in Atlanta
Animated drama films
20th Century Fox direct-to-video films
20th Century Fox animated films
1999 direct-to-video films
1999 films
African-American animated films
Animated films about time travel
American alternate history films
Motown soundtracks
1999 directorial debut films
1990s English-language films
1990s American films
American educational films